Mat Feagai (born 14 February 2001) is a Samoa international rugby league footballer who plays as a  er or  for the St. George Illawarra Dragons in the NRL.

Background 
Feagai was born in Hastings, New Zealand, and is of Samoan and Tokelauan descent.
He has a twin brother, Max Feagai, who also plays for the Dragons.

Career

Early career 
Feagai played his junior rugby league at the Leeton Greens in Group 20 Rugby League.

In 2019, he was selected for both the New South Wales Under-18's team and the Australian Schoolboys team after an impressive year where he won the 2019 S. G. Ball Cup with the Illawarra Steelers.

2021 
Feagai made his debut in round 9 of the 2021 NRL season for St. George Illawarra in their 32–12 victory against Canterbury-Bankstown, scoring a try.  Feagai played eight games throughout the season as St. George Illawarra finished 11th and missed the finals.

2022  
During round 6 of the  2022 NRL season Feagai scored a double as the  St. George Illawarra in their 21-16 win over the  Newcastle Knights.

In round 25, Feagai scored two tries  for St. George Illawarra in their victory over Brisbane.

In October Feagai was named in the Samoa squad for the 2021 Rugby League World Cup.

Statistics

References

External links 

Dragons profile
Samoa profile

2001 births
Living people
New Zealand rugby league players
New Zealand sportspeople of Samoan descent
New Zealand people of Tokelauan descent
Rugby league wingers
People from Hastings, New Zealand
Rugby league players from Hawke's Bay Region
St. George Illawarra Dragons players